The McGillicuddy Serious Party (McGSP) was a satirical political party in New Zealand in the late 20th century. Between 1984 and 1999, it provided "colour" to ensure that citizens not take the political process too seriously. The party's logo, the head of a medieval court jester, indicated its status as a joke party.

The party stood candidates in the 1984, 1987, 1990, 1993, 1996 and 1999 general elections and the 1986, 1989, 1992, 1995 and 1998 Local Body elections; along with local-body and parliamentary by-elections and university student association elections.

It gained its highest number of votes in the last first-past-the-post (FPP) general election in 1993, when it stood candidates in 62 out of 99 electorates and received 11,714 votes, 0.61% of the vote.

Origins 
The party was formed in 1984 in Hamilton as the political arm of Clan McGillicuddy (established in 1978). Members of the Clan had stood as candidates in the 1983 local-body elections in the Waikato, and the party came together in time to contest the 1984 General Election. It had a strong Scottish theme, with the kilt considered one of its symbols. Candidates included street performers and comedic musical groups such as the Big Muffin Serious Band.

Challenge for the Crown 
After discovering that he had some (rather obscure) relationship to the Stuart pretenders, Bonnie Prince Geoffie the Reluctant was advanced by Clan McGillicuddy in 1979 as replacement for Queen Elizabeth II. The Clan's armed wing, the McGillicuddy Highland Army (McGHA), attempted to settle the matter by trial by combat, challenging the New Zealand Army to a winner-takes-all pillow-fight; the army declined the offer. Armed "pacifist" insurrection using harmless weapons having failed, the Clan reluctantly turned to the ballot-box, contesting general elections from 1984 to 1999. The Clan has not totally given up the fight, as it continues to occasionally battle the loyalist forces of Alf's Imperial Army, a pro-British pacifist-warfare group that supported the Wizard of New Zealand and promoted the McGillicuddies' rival for the silly vote, the Imperial British Conservative Party. The two groups' most recent battle was on Sunday 15 February 2015, in Wellington.

The party sometimes became the subject of aggression from unexpected quarters: in 1990 Green Party candidate Warrick Pudney challenged his Te Atatū rival to a paper-sword fight in Aotea Square. The fight ended in a declared draw, with both combatants treated for paper cuts.

Selecting candidates 
At one point the party selected its candidates through trial by combat, with newspaper swords and water-balloons, the loser of the combat becoming the candidate. In 1996 a giant game of musical chairs took place in Cathedral Square, Christchurch to select the Canterbury electorate candidates. Whoever remained sitting on one of the labelled chairs when the music stopped became the candidate for that seat. Potential candidates for proportional representation (list) seats vied Cinderella-style by trying to fit into labelled shoes.

Policies 
The party selected its policies on the basis of their absurdity and their impracticality.

Central policies in every election included a return to a mediaeval lifestyle, known as the "Great Leap Backwards" and (superficially) the restoration of a monarchy supposedly based on the Scottish Jacobite line, in the name of Bonnie Prince Geoffie the reluctant. At a deeper level the party invoked the political system of Tibetan Buddhism, with "stspm" (singularly transferable spirit possession monarchy) used as justification for the selection of Bonnie Prince Geoffie as the undeniable head of the McState. This embodied the principles stated by the ancient Greeks that "no-one who seeks power should be allowed it." Bonnie Prince Geoffie refused consistently and permanently to have anything to do with the authority that this position gave him, and ran for all he was worth and never had anything to do with party again, thus proving his indisputable worthiness for the position.

Other policies included:

Free dung
Sending out intelligence agents around the world to wipe New Zealand off published maps, thus ensuring that no-one could invade the country.
Standing a dog for parliament in the Hobson seat in Northland. Her policies included the abolition of cars, and turning a meat-works into an organic flea-powder factory.
The abolition of money, replacing it with chocolate fish or with sand.
The demolition of The Beehive, parliament buildings, and all other buildings on a last-up, first-down basis.
The diversion of aluminium production away from building US military aircraft and missiles to build giant space-mirrors to melt the polar icecaps and destroy all of the foolish greed-worshipping cities of man in one stroke, thereby returning man to the sea, which he should never have left in the first place (this the inspiration of the Admiral of the Highland Navy Aaron Franklin).
Raising the school leaving-age to 65 (after Parliament raised the school leaving-age by one unambitious year)
Full unemployment, or full employment through slavery
Using beer as a National Defence strategy: leaving bottles of beer on all beaches, so that any invading army would abandon its attack and get drunk while the broken bottles would prevent the army advancing any further.
Restricting the vote to minors: i.e., ONLY those under 18 years of age could vote (announced when Parliament lowered the voting age to 18 years). The party ran its 1993 electoral advertisements during children's programming.
Student loans for Plunket Society (or Kindergarten) attendance: prior to the 1984 election, David Lange's Labour Party promised to maintain free tertiary education, but the Education Minister, Phil Goff, introduced student fees when elected. National Party education spokesman Lockwood Smith promised a return to free education if elected, but did not carry out this promise.  Most party supporters, many of them students, felt displeased that both major political parties had deemed free tertiary education unsustainable, but had deliberately lied about their intentions to attract votes.
Abandoning male suffrage: New Zealand, the first nation to achieve women's suffrage (in 1893), made a big deal of the centenary of this at the time of the 1993 election.
Votes for trees: New Zealanders have a reputation as environmentalists, and the University of Auckland's ex-Marxist law lecturer Klaus Bosselmann seriously advocated giving trees (and other bits of the environment) some legal standing.  The party could not decide on whether native trees should have the option to vote in Māori electorates, whether male trees as well as female trees should vote, and on the status of shrubs.
The demolition of the Auckland CBD to create a giant sundial, using the Sky Tower as the gnomon; or to protect the Sky Tower by placing a condom over it.
Replacing the Royal New Zealand Armoured Corps with Mounted Knights, claimed as more modern.  The New Zealand Army's outdated equipment became a constant source of quips and embarrassment in the 1990s—at the time Queen Alexandra's Mounted Rifles operated FV101 Scorpions and M-113s.
Building dreadnoughts in the Tamaki Estuary: a reference to the Royal New Zealand Navy's controversial purchase of Anzac class frigates.
An All Whites victory in the Football World Cup: both the Labour Party and the National Party used the All Blacks' victory in the 1987 Rugby World Cup in their 1990 campaigning—the All Whites stood about as much chance of winning the Football World Cup as Brazil have of winning the Rugby version.
An indecent society: Jim Bolger's National Party used the slogan "A Decent Society".
A potato famine: Jim Bolger's somewhat pock-marked countenance bore an unfortunate resemblance to a potato.  Much to his displeasure, he became widely known as "Spud"; the Royal New Zealand Air Force, with a typically Kiwi lack of reverence, christened his Boeing 727 "Spud One".
Limiting the speed of light to 100 km/h: 50 km/h in Mt Roskill, (Auckland's Bible Belt), because folks there preferred to stay less enlightened.
Linking the North Island and South Island by bulldozing the Southern Alps into Cook Strait.
Post-natal abortion: making abortion illegal, but any mother could kill her child up to the age of 18, provided she did it with her own hands.  The party designed this policy to offend all sides in the abortion debate. The fundamentalist Christian Heritage Party used abortion as a major policy.
Mandatory homosexuality for 33% of the population—also devised to annoy the fundamentalists.
Free castration
Setting up a Frivolous Fraud Office to investigate any fraud deemed too silly for the Serious Fraud Office
Air bags for the New Zealand Stock Exchange (following the 1987 stock market crash)
Replacing the Queen's chain with hemp: the Labour Party had a policy of protecting and extending the Queen's chain (publicly accessible land bordering watercourses), forcing farmers and iwi to allow public access to waterways.  Candidate Dominic Worthington proposed replacing the chain with more environmentally sound hemp; with the Queen, of course, replaced by Prince Geoffie the reluctant. Rather than limiting the chain to protecting water in aqueous form, the King's hemp would also serve to hold together water in solid form, as in the ice in glaciers and in the Ross Dependency (in particular, the Ross Ice Shelf, alleviating environmentalists' concerns that the ice shelf might collapse and raise sea-levels). Ultimately, the policy envisaged that technology would regress far enough for it to become feasible to lasso water in gaseous form (i.e. clouds).
Fixing accountants in concrete and using them as traffic barriers, occasionally accompanied by a pledge to steal some of the Monster Raving Loony Party's other policies as well—possibly a reference to political parties accusing each other of stealing policies, or possibly just silliness.
Good weather (but only if voters behaved).
Full employment by carpeting the national highways: this would also save wear and tear on tyres
Breaking its promises

Decline 
The party attracted a surprising level of support, and became one of the larger parties outside parliament. On a number of occasions, particularly following the introduction of the mixed member proportional (MMP) electoral system, pundits predicted that the party might actually win parliamentary representation, but this never happened. When the major parties boycotted the Tauranga by-election 1993 in 1993, the party's candidate Greg Pittams, who appeared in nationwide newspapers during this campaign wearing his "emperor's new kilt" outfit, consisting of only a shirt and sporran, finished second to Winston Peters. Votes for the party presumably most often represented protest votes, something that the party encouraged with one of its slogans: "If you want to waste your vote, vote for us."

The party began to encounter the problem that often appears in joke parties—a debate about exactly how serious it should become. The founders of the party essentially saw it as "a bit of fun", aimed at providing humour and entertainment. This remained a major part of the party. However, later recruits to the party sometimes saw the party's satire in a more serious context, regarding it as a tool with which people could ridicule and challenge the political establishment. In particular a number of anarchists joined the party, seeing it as an antidote to the traditional order and intending to use the party as a vehicle to give anarchist policies a higher public profile. The dichotomy, in essence, grew between "satire for fun" and "satire to make a political point". Many of the party's original members resented what they saw as a usurpation of the party for more avowedly political and overdefined anarchist purposes, and felt that for the party to become openly "anarchist" would thus make some area of politics "off-limits" to satire. They saw this as an anathema. In addition they saw having a clearly identifiable stance as lessening the party's effectiveness as satirists. However other members had little problem with the expression of more openly anarchist viewpoints.

In the 1996 general election the party put up 65 list candidates, and 45 candidates stood as an electorate candidate.

Disbandment and deregistration 
The 1999 election campaign proved a disappointment. The party gained only 0.15% of the vote, a considerable drop. Shortly after the election, the party disbanded and the Electoral Commission officially deregistered it as a political party. Party leader Graeme Cairns marked the event and did penance for the loss by placing himself in stocks in Garden Place in Hamilton in December 1999 as disgruntled party members pelted him with rotten fruit.

Electoral results 
The following table summarises the party's support in general elections.

By-elections

McGillicuddy candidates 
A number of former members went on to stand as candidates for "real" parties. Former MP and co-leader of the Green party, Metiria Turei, formerly held party membership, and was number 27 on the party list for the 1999 General Election. Other prominent candidates from this first generation of electioneering included founder and Party Leader Graeme Cairns, the "Laird of Hamilton"; Mark Servian; KT Julian, a long-time Party Deputy Leader; Adrian Holroyd; Cecil G. Murgatroyd (who subsequently stood against Australian Prime Minister Bob Hawke under the Imperial British Conservative Party banner); Sam Buchanan; Steve Richards; Donna Demente; and Penni Bousfield.

Younger pretenders 
Some of the party's original members became upset at the cancellation of their lifetime membership. In July 2005 a "McGillicuddy Serious Party" put out a press-release announcing plans to participate in the 2005 election, one initial policy involving replacing MPs with harmless jargon-generators. A former member put out the press-release without the knowledge of the Clan McGillicuddy's senior members or of the party's former leadership.

After intense discussions within the Clan McGillicuddy, no further press releases appeared, no official party registration took place, and neither the party nor any candidates appeared on the 2005 ballot.

One candidate stood under the McGillicuddy Serious banner in the 2008 general election: Steve Richards contested the West Coast-Tasman electorate and received 259 votes.

A member from the Party's early days, Richards had stood as a candidate in previous elections.

Current status 
Despite the demise of the party, Clan McGillicuddy continued to hold regular public events for some time. A pacifist battle in Oamaru on 31 December 2007 saw McGillicuddy "Martians" take on Alf's Imperial Army in an enactment of The War of the Worlds. YouTube hosts a video of this battle. On 31 December 2013, there was a pacifist battle in Waitati in which the McGillicuddies defended Castle Almond (the castle-like home of one their members) against an "attack" by the local Waitati Militia.

See also 

 List of frivolous political parties

References

External links 
 A copy of the 1999 McGillicuddy Serious Party manifesto
 Cecil Murgatroyd's election site

Videos
 McGSP advert from the 1993 electoral campaign
 "Martian" battle, Oamaru, 31 December 2007. On YouTube
 2012 Video interview with Mark Servian, long-time party bigwig, and Graeme Cairns, Party Leader

Jacobitism
Joke political parties in New Zealand
Political parties established in 1984
Political parties disestablished in 1999
Defunct political parties in New Zealand